The Millsaps–Mississippi College rivalry is a sports rivalry between the Millsaps College Majors and the Mississippi College Choctaws. It chiefly manifests in the college football matchup, known as the Backyard Brawl as both schools are located near to Jackson, Mississippi. The colleges compete in Division III of the NCAA, Mississippi College in the American Southwest Conference (ASC) and Millsaps in the Southern Athletic Association (SAA).

The two schools met nearly every year in various sports from 1920 through spring 1960, after which time the series was cancelled when a fight broke out at a men's basketball game. The college football series was resumed in 2000. Mississippi College leads it 31–15-6.

History
The series began in 1920, when Millsaps College fielded its first college football team. The game was played annually from then until 1959, except for a four-year hiatus during World War II. To that point Mississippi College dominated the rivalry with a win–loss record of 24–9–6. The series was cancelled after fighting broke out at a Millsaps–Mississippi College basketball game in early 1960. Mississippi College students had taken a flag from a Millsaps fraternity and threw it in the air during the game; when Millsaps students went to retrieve it a scuffle ensued. Sports games between the schools were subsequently cancelled; though a few basketball games were played over the years, there were no football games for another four decades.

Later, the Mississippi Sports Council worked with both schools to resume the football series, which was dubbed the "Backyard Brawl" due to the colleges' proximity in the Jackson area. The first game was held on September 2, 2000 at Mississippi Veterans Memorial Stadium and reportedly drew 13,000 fans, an NCAA Division III record. The teams annually opened their seasons against one another at Memorial Stadium from then through the 2004 season. In 2005, the series took another brief hiatus when Mississippi College began preparing for a potential move to Division II, where they could grant athletic scholarships. This move never came to fruition, however, and the series resumed in 2006, again as an opening week contest but with the games alternating between the schools' campuses. The renewed rivalry has been hotly contested. In 11 games since 2000, the average margin of victory is 9.8 points; 10 of those games have been decided by 13 points or less, with an average victory margin of 5.7 points. Five of the Six meetings since 2006 have been decided by 6 points or fewer, including two games that required overtime to determine a winner (2009 and 2011). The Choctaws currently lead the modern series 7–6, giving them an advantage of 31–15–6 all-time.

Game results

Historic rivalry (1920–1959)

Modern rivalry (2000–2013)

See also  
 List of NCAA college football rivalry games

References

College football rivalries in the United States
Millsaps Majors football
Mississippi College Choctaws football